Valeriy Viktorovych Zhuravko (5 September 1947 – 23 March 2020) was a Soviet football player and a Ukrainian football coach. He was known as a creator and coach of FC Artania Ochakiv.

Valeriy Zhuravko had a younger brother, Oleh, who also used to play and was a coaching staff of FC Artania Ochakiv.

References

External links
 

1947 births
2020 deaths
People from Ochakiv
Soviet football managers
Ukrainian football managers
Ukrainian Premier League managers
FC Artania Ochakiv managers
MFC Mykolaiv managers
MFC Mykolaiv players
FC Avanhard Ternopil players
FC Krystal Kherson players
SC Odesa players
Soviet footballers
Ukrainian footballers
Association football midfielders
Association football forwards
Sportspeople from Mykolaiv Oblast